Thupden Bhutia (born 6 January 1987) was an Indian footballer playing for United Sikkim.

Career

United Sikkim
Bhutia made his debut for United Sikkim F.C. on 29 December 2012 during an I-League match against ONGC F.C. at the Ambedkar Stadium in Delhi in which he was in the starting 11 and was substituted in the 64th-minute by Safar Sardar. United Sikkim drew the match 1–1.

Career statistics

Club
Statistics accurate on 12 May 2013

References 

United Sikkim F.C. players
Indian footballers
Footballers from Sikkim
Living people
1987 births
Association football midfielders